Routray is a surname of Khandayat Caste originating in Odisha, India. It may refer to:

  Gajapati Kapilendra Routray, Indian emperor and the founder of the  Suryavanshi Gajapati dynasty
 Madhab Chandra Routray, Indian leader who led a revolt against the British East India Company
 Bijayshree Routray, Indian politician
 Nilamani Routray, Indian politician 
 Sachidananda Routray, Indian Odia-language literary figure
 Samaresh Routray, Indian film actor, producer and television personality
 Supriya Routray, Indian footballer

References